Canada competed at the 1924 Summer Olympics in Paris, France. 65 competitors, all men, took part in 39 events in 8 sports.

In January 1924, Canadian Olympic Committee secretary-treasurer Fred Marples announced that sending the Canadian team to the Summer Olympics would cost C$40,000. He stated that unless the Canadian Olympic Committee could raise $20,000 to $25,000 within a couple months, the national team would be small and not representative of Canadian athletics. He felt that it was the duty of all Canadian citizens to help, and urged contributions from individuals, organizations, and provincial governments. After the games, he reported that it cost $460 to send each athlete to France, but the Canadian Olympic Committee still had financial reserves despite being approximately $1100 over budget. The Amateur Athletic Union of Canada praised Marples and Canadian Olympic Committee executives for their efforts and assembling the largest Canadian Olympic team to date.

Medalists

Aquatics

Swimming

Ranks given are within the heat.

Athletics

Twenty-seven athletes represented Canada in 1924. It was the nation's sixth appearance in the sport.

Ranks given are within the heat.

Boxing 

Nine boxers represented Canada at the 1924 Games. It was the nation's second appearance in the sport. Facing tougher competition, Canada's team was unable to achieve results comparable to the five medals earned in 1920. Lewis was the only Canadian boxer in 1924 to win a medal, taking the bronze in the welterweight.

Cycling

A single cyclist represented Canada in 1924. It was the nation's fourth appearance in the sport.

Road cycling

Ranks given are within the heat.

Track cycling

Ranks given are within the heat.

Rowing

14 rowers represented Canada in 1924. It was the nation's fifth appearance in the sport, tying Belgium and Great Britain for most appearances. Canada won a pair of silver medals, its first rowing medals since 1912 and tying its best rowing result (a silver medal in 1904).

Ranks given are within the heat.

Sailing

A single sailor represented Canada in 1924. It was the nation's debut in the sport.

Shooting

Six sport shooters represented Canada in 1924. It was the nation's fourth appearance in the sport. The six-man clay pigeon teams finished second to earn Canada's first medal in shooting since 1908. The three members of the team who competed in the individual trap all finished in the top six, with Montgomery finishing outside the medals only because of a tie-breaker.

Wrestling

Freestyle wrestling

 Men's

References

Nations at the 1924 Summer Olympics
1924
Olympics